Marquette is a city in Clayton County, Iowa, United States. The population was 429 at the time of the 2020 census, up from 421 in 2000. The city, which is located on the Mississippi River, is named after Jesuit missionary Jacques Marquette, who along with Louis Joliet discovered the Mississippi River just southeast of the city on June 17, 1673.

History

Marquette is located directly across from Prairie du Chien, Wisconsin, and the two cities are connected by U.S. Route 18, which crosses the river on the Marquette-Joliet Bridge. Effigy Mounds National Monument and the Yellow River State Forest are a few miles to the north. The city of McGregor is located just to the south. Marquette itself was originally incorporated as North McGregor in 1874, and it served as a railroad terminus for its southern neighbor.

Along with McGregor, the city became a major hub on the railroad, as grain from throughout Iowa and Minnesota was sent through the city en route to Lake Michigan. Initially trains had to be ferried across the river between Marquette and Prairie du Chien, Wisconsin, in order to continue their journey, but this system came to an end when Prairie du Chien businessman John Lawler had a permanent pontoon bridge built to connect the two cities' rail lines. Marquette subsequently became home to a major rail yard, which even as late as 1920 was the busiest in Iowa, employing 400 people. Not too long afterwards, the railroad's significance declined, the last passenger train stopped in Marquette in 1960, and the pontoon bridge was disassembled in 1961. Today the city is a tourist destination along the mighty Mississippi River; with Antique Shops (School House Mall & My Kinda Stuff), A Winery (Eagles Landing Winery), Riverboat Cruise (Maiden Voyage Tours), Riverboat Casino (Casino Queen), Motels, Hotels and Bed & Baths for your stay.

Geography

Demographics

2010 census
As of the census of 2010, there were 375 people, 182 households, and 104 families living in the city. The racial makeup of the city was 98.7% White, 0.8% Native American, 0.3% Asian, and 0.3% from two or more races. Hispanic or Latino of any race were 0.5% of the population.

There were 182 households, of which 24.2% had children under the age of 18 living with them, 45.1% were married couples living together, 6.6% had a female householder with no husband present, 5.5% had a male householder with no wife present, and 42.9% were non-families. 35.2% of all households were made up of individuals, and 13.7% had someone living alone who was 65 years of age or older. The average household size was 2.06 and the average family size was 2.60.

The median age in the city was 46.6 years. 19.2% of residents were under the age of 18; 6% were between the ages of 18 and 24; 23.7% were from 25 to 44; 30.2% were from 45 to 64; and 20.8% were 65 years of age or older. The gender makeup of the city was 49.9% male and 50.1% female.

2000 census
As of the census of 2000, there were 421 people, 194 households, and 108 families living in the city. The racial makeup of the city was 98.57% White, 0.48% African American and 0.95% Native American. Hispanic or Latino of any race were 0.71% of the population.

There were 194 households, out of which 24.2% had children under the age of 18 living with them, 42.3% were married couples living together, 8.8% had a female householder with no husband present, and 44.3% were non-families. 37.6% of all households were made up of individuals, and 12.9% had someone living alone who was 65 years of age or older. The average household size was 2.17 and the average family size was 2.91.

Age spread: 22.3% under the age of 18, 9.0% from 18 to 24, 28.7% from 25 to 44, 26.8% from 45 to 64, and 13.1% who were 65 years of age or older. The median age was 39 years. For every 100 females, there were 91.4 males. For every 100 females age 18 and over, there were 97.0 males.

Education
It is within the MFL MarMac Community School District. The district formed on July 1, 1994 with the merger of the Mar-Mac and M-F-L districts.

References

External links
 McGregor-Marquette Chamber of Commerce website

Cities in Iowa
Cities in Clayton County, Iowa
Iowa populated places on the Mississippi River
1874 establishments in Iowa
Populated places established in 1874